Lad is a village in the Badhra tehsil of the Bhiwani district in the Indian state of Haryana. , the village had 450 households with a total population of 2,376 of which 1,256 were male and 1,120 female.

References

Villages in Bhiwani district